Jakob Ankersen (born 22 September 1990) is a Danish professional footballer who plays as a winger for Randers FC in the Danish Superliga. He is the twin brother of FC Copenhagen player Peter Ankersen.

Career

Esbjerg fB
On 24 June 2009, alongside his twin brother signed a professional contract and was promoted to the first team squad. He got his breakthrough in the 2010–11 season and was rewarded with a new contract until 2014. He extended his contract once again in July 2012 this time until 2016. He quickly became a regular part of the squad and played 32 league games in the 2012–13 season.

Alongside twin brother Peter, he played an integral part of the Esbjerg fB team that following promotion won the Danish Cup and finished 4th in the Danish Superliga, forming a fast and aggressive right side for Esbjerg.

After three successful season, Ankersen became a very wanted player, and his agent revealed in December 2013, that there had bin interest from the Netherlands and Belgium. According to BT, Ankersen rejected a bid from Norwegian club Rosenborg BK in August 2014.
 In January 2015 Ankersen announced, that he was looking for a new club to play for. Later the same day Esbjerg confirmed, that they hoped he remained at the club.

IFK Göteborg
On 2 February 2015, Ankersen signed a three-year contract with Allsvenskan club IFK Göteborg. He played his first match for the club on 5 April 2015 against Åtvidabergs FF. In his first season at, he won the Svenska Cupen, came on second place in both the Allsvenskan and the Svenska Supercupen, and played 35 matches.

In the January transfer market 2016–17, IFK Göteborg revealed, that they were ready to sell Ankersen, if they received a good bid. There was interest from Belgium.

Zulte Waregem
Ankersen signed for Zulte Waregem on 30 January 2017.

Ankersen's first season at the club was a nightmare for him. He only played 35 minutes in the first half season and was left out of the squad in nine matches. He described the situation as "a disaster and chaotic". In May 2017 Ankersen revealed, that he was furious at the club because they hadn’t complied with their promises. He also said, that he would more than like to leave the club.

Esbjerg fB
On 6 August 2020, Ankersen returned to newly relegated Danish 1st Division club Esbjerg fB on a three-year deal.

On 9 July 2021, Esbjerg confirmed that Ankersen, alongside three teammates, had been removed from the first team and sent down to train with the U19s. It came in the wake of a riot between players from the squad and the club's new coach, Peter Hyballa. According to Danish media, the squad was very dissatisfied with the coach's methods, describing it as Hyballa was "...photographing players in underpants, punching the players, shaming them in front of their teammates, verbal torture and a training program so hard that the injuries were rolling in". As a result of the whole situation, Ankersen decided to resign from his contract on 10 August 2021.

Randers
Immediately after his departure from Esbjerg was announced, on 10 August 2021, Ankersen was presented as a new Randers FC player, signing a deal until June 2022.

Career statistics

Honours

Esbjerg fB
Danish 1st Division: 2011–12
Danish Cup: 2012–13

IFK Göteborg
 Svenska Cupen: 2014–15

References

External links

1990 births
Living people
People from Esbjerg
Danish twins
Sportspeople from the Region of Southern Denmark
Danish men's footballers
Association football wingers
Denmark under-21 international footballers
Danish Superliga players
Allsvenskan players
Belgian Pro League players
Esbjerg fB players
IFK Göteborg players
S.V. Zulte Waregem players
Randers FC players
Aarhus Gymnastikforening players
Danish expatriate men's footballers
Danish expatriate sportspeople in Sweden
Expatriate footballers in Sweden
Danish expatriate sportspeople in Belgium
Expatriate footballers in Belgium